The Skogbrukets Landsforening (SL) is an employers' organisation in Norway, organized under the national Confederation of Norwegian Enterprise.

It was established in 1928 under the name Skogbrukets Arbeidsgiverforening.

The current Director General is Haavard Elstrand. Chairman of the board is Gudbrand Kvaal.

References

External links
Official site

Employers' organisations in Norway
1928 establishments in Norway
Organizations established in 1928